George's Cove, Labrador, is located on the north shore of Granby Island. The first postmaster was Berton Henry Penney. The 1945 census reported 23 residents in George's Cove.

See also
List of communities in Newfoundland and Labrador
List of people of Newfoundland and Labrador

References

Populated coastal places in Canada
Populated places in Labrador